Acral persistent papular mucinosis is a skin condition caused by fibroblasts producing abnormally large amounts of mucopolysaccharides, characterized by bilaterally symmetrical, flesh-colored papules localized to the hands and wrists.

See also 
 Papular mucinosis
 List of cutaneous conditions

References

External links 

Mucinoses